Raúl Fajardo Moreno was a Colombian architect in Medellín. He designed the Coltejer Building, Medellín's tallest building with Hernando Vélez, Germán Samper and Jorge Manjarrés.

Asked about which of his projects were his favorites he said "There are many. City University U. of A., Coltejer building, Headquarters of Southamerican Insurance and many others. But I would change every one if I was going to create them today."

He married with María Valderrama Tobón and their children are Sergio, María Isabel, Andrés, Rodrigo and Silvia. He died at the end of July, 2012.

Works

 Coltejer Building
 Citadel at the University of Antioquia
 Suramericana de Seguros SouthAmerican Insurance headquarters
 Coltabaco
 Banco Cafetero building (Coffee Bank building) 
 Vicente Uribe Rendón building
 Corfivalle
 Colegio San Ignacio
 the Inem in Medellín
Lyceum at the University of Antioquia 
 Premium Plaza 
City Plaza, his most recent work

References

Colombian architects
Year of birth missing
2012 deaths